Mariasole Pollio (born 18 July 2003) is an Italian actress, television presenter, radio personality and model.

Biography 
Mariasole Pollio was born on 18 July 2003 in Naples, from mother Rosaria and father Giuseppe Pollio, and also has a brother named Roberto. At the age of three, her mother enrolled her in a theatre course.

Career 
At the age of seven Pollio was enrolled in her city's film school to study acting. During his high school years he decides to open a YouTube channel. Later she enrolled in the linguistic baccalaureate, earning a diploma. In 2011, she starred in the series Violetta la traviata. In 2013 she starred in the short film Il mozzicone equilibrista directed by Luigi Scaglione. In 2016 she starred in the short film Giulia directed by Salvatore De Chiara.

Since 2017, together with Alan Palmieri and Elisabetta Gregoraci, he has hosted the music program Battiti Live, broadcast on Radionorba and Italia 1.

In 2018 she auditioned to join the cast of the series Don Matteo in the role of Sofia Gagliardi. In the same year she was chosen by Leonardo Pieraccioni to act in his film Se son rose with the role of Yolanda, and she received the Charlot Revelation Fiction Award 2018. In the same year she participated in the Giffoni Film Festival. In the same year he took part in the music video Mi chiedevo se by Francesco Sole. On 23 February 2019, she was a testimonial of the Kinder Ice Cream brand.

In 2020 she hosted the streaming event program MAS for From Milan With Love – Next Gen, along with DJ Khaled and Max Brigante. In the same year he participated in the television program Vieni con me, broadcast on Rai 1 with the conduction of Caterina Balivo. In the same year he took part in the music video Sembro matto by Max Pezzali.

In 2021 she played the role of Martina in the short film La regina di cuori directed by Thomas Turolo, and published her first book published by Mondadori, Oltre. In 2021 she directed the Battiti Summer Trend program, a spin-off of Battiti Live broadcast on the Mediaset Infinity platform.

In 2022, together with Elenoire Casalegno and Nicolò De Devitiis, he hosted the music program Battiti Live presenta: MSC Crociere – Il viaggio della musica, a spin-off of Battiti Live broadcast on Radionorba and Italia 1. In the same year, together with Rebecca Staffelli, she led the Coca Cola Summer Festival, broadcast by Radio 105. In 2022, she played the role of Mia in the short film La bambola di pezza directed by Nicola Conversa.

In 2022 she began her experience as a radio host for Radio 105, hosting the 105 Summer Compilation program. Since 11 September 2022 she has hosted 105 Loves Music, a radio program broadcast every Sunday on Radio 105. In 2023 she played the role of Greta in the television documentary Pooh - Un attimo ancora directed by Nicola Conversa.

Personal life 
Mariasole Pollio since 2022 has been romantically linked to Marco Salvaderi, drummer and member of the musical group Room9.

Filmography

Films

Television

Web TV

Radio

Works

Awards and honours 
Charlot awards

References

External links 

 

2003 births
Living people
People from Naples
Italian television presenters
Italian women television presenters
Italian radio presenters
Italian women radio presenters
Italian female models
Italian twins
Twin models